A showdown is a duel. The term may also refer to:

Places
 Showdown Ski Area, in Montana, United States

Books
 Showdown (Amado novel), a 1984 novel by Jorge Amado
 Showdown (Dekker novel), a 2006 novel by Ted Dekker
 Showdown (Flynn novel), a 1946 novel by Errol Flynn
 Showdown: The Inside Story of How Obama Fought Back Against Boehner, Cantor, and the Tea Party, a 2012 book by David Corn
 The Showdown, a novel in the Left Behind: The Kids series

Film and TV

Film
 Showdown (1942 film), a Superman animated short 
 Showdown (1963 film), an American western starring Audie Murphy
 Showdown (1973 film), an American western starring Dean Martin
 Showdown (1993 film), a film starring Billy Blanks
 Showdown, a 2000 film directed by Izu Ojukwu
 The Showdown (1928 film), a film starring Evelyn Brent
 The Showdown (1940 film), a Hopalong Cassidy film
 The Showdown (1950 film), a film starring Marie Windsor
 The Showdown (2011 film), a South Korean film starring Park Hie-soon

Television 
 Showdown (Canadian game show), a 1961-1962 Canadian program 
 Showdown (U.S. game show), a 1966 program made by Heatter-Quigley Productions
 Showdown: Air Combat, a program on the Military Channel
 "Showdown" (Cheers)
 "Showdown" (How I Met Your Mother)
 "Showdown" (The Adventures of Batman & Robin)
 "The Showdown" (The O.C.)

Games and sports 
 Showdown (AFL), a derby match in the Australian Football League
 Showdown (game), a word and trivia game
 Showdown (NTN/Buzztime Game), an online trivia game
 Showdown (poker), the final round in a poker match
 Showdown (sport), a sport for the blind and visually impaired
 Showdown, briefly-used basketball name for the NBA Finals in the 1980s
 Showdown: Legends of Wrestling, a 2004 video game

Music 
 The Showdown (band), a Christian metal band

Albums
 Showdown (Electric Light Orchestra album)
 Showdown (The Isley Brothers album)
 Showdown!, a blues album by Albert Collins, Robert Cray, and Johnny Copeland 1986
 Showdown, an album by Al Kapone and Mr. Sche
 The Showdown (album), an album by Allen-Lande

Songs
 "Showdown" (Electric Light Orchestra song), 1973
 "Showdown" (Pendulum song), 2009
 "Showdown", by Billy Ocean from Love Zone
 "Showdown", by Black Eyed Peas from The E.N.D.
 "Showdown", by Britney Spears from In the Zone
 "Showdown", by Carol Lloyd from Score
 "Showdown", by Cheri Dennis from In and Out of Love
 "Showdown", by Crucial Conflict from The Final Tic
 "Showdown", by E-A-Ski
 "Showdown", by Thin Lizzy from Nightlife

Other
 Showdown cooperative learning, an educational technique
 The Showdown (AVA Shorts), the fourth episode of Animator Vs. Animation Shorts animated by Alan Becker and various animators.

See also 
 The Big Showdown, a 1974-1975 TV program made by Don Lipp Productions and Ron Greenberg Productions